Seán Geaney is Gaelic football coach and selector.  In the 2008 season, he was a selector with the Kerry senior football team and managed the Kerry team which won the All-Ireland Under-21 Football Championship.

He played senior football for Kerry in the 1990s and was a star player with Dingle GAA and West Kerry.  Geaney was manager of the Kerry Minor Football team in 2004 and 2005.  Under new manager Pat O'Shea, Geaney became a Kerry selector for 2007 and 2008.  In 2008, Geaney was also appointed as the Kerry U21 manager.  The team won the Munster championship and subsequently reached the All-Ireland final, in which they overcame Kildare.

References

Year of birth missing (living people)
Living people
Dingle Gaelic footballers
Gaelic football selectors
Kerry inter-county Gaelic footballers